Gustavo Aguerre (born 1953 in Buenos Aires, Argentina) is an artist, photographer, curator, writer, and theatre designer.

Career
Aguerre studied at the Munich Art Academy between 1974 and 1976. He subsequently moved to Sweden. In collaboration with his wife, Ingrid Falk, he set up an art collective in Stockholm called FA+ in 1992. Amongst the artists who have worked with FA+ are Nicola Pellegrini, Otonella Mocellin, Daniel Wetter, Lennie Lee.

Aguerre and Falk have worked on a number of site-specific installations throughout Europe. These involve large-scale installations, photographic projections, sculptures, and video installations in Stockholm.

Exhibitions 
He has exhibited in museums and private galleries including:
 Malmo Museum, Sweden (1996)
 Rich and Famous Gallery, London (1998)
 Italian Pavilion Venice Biennale (1999) 
 Galeria Milano (1999)
 ARCO, Madrid (2000)
 Museo bellas Artes, Buenos Aires
 Konstnarhuset, Stockholm
 Sternersenmuseet, Oslo
 Tirana Biennial, Albania (2001)
 Reykjavik Art Museum, Iceland (2002)
 National Center of Contemporary Art (2005)

References

External links
Gustavo Aguerre's Photographic works

1953 births
Living people
Argentine photographers
People from Buenos Aires
Swedish contemporary artists
Argentine contemporary artists